Marion Downtown Commercial Historic District is a national historic district located at Marion, Grant County, Indiana. It encompasses 52 contributing buildings, 2 contributing structures, and 1 contributing object in the central business district of Marion. It developed between about 1870 and 1942, and includes notable examples of Italianate, Romanesque, and Classical Revival style architecture. Located in the district is the separately listed Grant County Jail and Sheriff's Residence.  Other notable buildings are the Grant County Courthouse (1881–1883), Marion Bank Building (c. 1917), Iroquois Building (c. 1895), Dan-Mar Apartments (c. 1900), United Telephone Block (c. 1903), Cecelian Apartments (c. 1915), Marion Post Office (c. 1942), and William Smith Building / Mecca Club (c. 1917).

It was listed on the National Register of Historic Places in 1994.

References

Marion, Indiana
Historic districts on the National Register of Historic Places in Indiana
Romanesque Revival architecture in Indiana
Italianate architecture in Indiana
Neoclassical architecture in Indiana
Historic districts in Grant County, Indiana
National Register of Historic Places in Grant County, Indiana